Desmarets is a surname. Notable people with the surname include:

 Henri Desmarets (1661–1741), French composer
 Jean Desmarets (1595–1676), French writer and dramatist
 Nicolas Desmarets, Controller-General of Finances during the reign of Louis XIV of France
 Yves Desmarets, French-born Haitian footballer